Gordon Phillips may refer to:

 Gordon Phillips (economist) (born 1964), American economist and author
 Gordon Phillips (footballer) (1946–2018), English football goalkeeper and coach
 Gordon Phillips (priest) (1911–1982), Anglican priest and author

See also 
 Gordon Rich-Phillips (born 1974), Australian politician